Marcus Aaron Robertson (born October 2, 1969) is an American football coach and former safety who is the defensive backs coach for the New Orleans Saints of the National Football League (NFL). He previously served as an assistant coach for the Arizona Cardinals, Denver Broncos, Oakland Raiders, Detroit Lions and Tennessee Titans.

Robertson has spent the last 28 seasons in the NFL as a player, administrator and coach, and has coached defensive backs in the NFL for the last 12 seasons.

Playing career

College

Robertson played college football at Iowa State. During his four seasons as a cornerback at Iowa State, Robertson totaled 257 tackles, six interceptions and nine forced fumbles. He was inducted into the Iowa State Athletic Hall of Fame in 2009.

NFL

Robertson was drafted by the Houston Oilers in the fourth round of the 1991 NFL Draft. Robertson was named an NFL All-Pro in 1993 and played in 162 regular-season games (144 starts). He finished his career with 24 interceptions and 72 passes defensed.

Administrative career

Robertson spent four seasons (2003–2006) as the Titans’ director of player development. Robertson and his staff won the Winston and Shell Award in 2006 for their innovation and commitment to player development in the NFL.

Coaching career

Tennessee Titans
Robertson began his coaching career as the assistant secondary coach for the Tennessee Titans from 2007 to 2008, and eventually the head secondary coach from 2009 to 2011. Robertson helped the team rank second in the NFL in average passing yards per completion (10.6) during that span.

Detroit Lions
On February 13, 2012, Robertson was hired by the Detroit Lions as their assistant secondary coach. Robertson had previously coached with former Lions head coach Jim Schwartz and former Lions defensive coordinator Gunther Cunningham when both were assistants with the Titans. Robertson was not retained by the Lions following the firing of Schwartz and the team's failure to make the playoffs in 2013.

Oakland Raiders
On February 3, 2014, Robertson was hired by the Oakland Raiders as their assistant defensive backs coach under defensive backs coach Joe Woods and head coach Dennis Allen. On January 21, 2015, Robertson was promoted to defensive backs coach under new head coach Jack Del Rio, during the off-season Robertson earned the endorsement of veteran player Charles Woodson. The Raiders totaled the eighth-most interceptions (30) and the sixth-most passes defensed (163) in the NFL during Robertson’s two seasons leading Oakland’s defensive backs.

Denver Broncos
On January 16, 2017, Robertson was hired by the Denver Broncos as their defensive backs coach under head coach Vance Joseph, replacing former defensive backs coach Joe Woods, who was promoted to defensive coordinator.

Arizona Cardinals
On February 6, 2019, Robertson was hired by the Arizona Cardinals as their defensive backs coach under defensive coordinator Vance Joseph and head coach Kliff Kingsbury.

References

External links
Oakland Raiders bio
Detroit Lions bio
Tennessee Titans bio

1969 births
Living people
Sportspeople from Pasadena, California
Players of American football from Pasadena, California
American football safeties
American football cornerbacks
Arizona Cardinals coaches
Denver Broncos coaches
Detroit Lions coaches
Houston Oilers players
Iowa State Cyclones football players
Oakland Raiders coaches
Seattle Seahawks players
Tennessee Oilers players
Tennessee Titans players
Tennessee Titans coaches
Ed Block Courage Award recipients